The Lady from Cheyenne is a 1941 American comedy western film directed by Frank Lloyd and starring Loretta Young, Robert Preston and Edward Arnold.

Plot
In the 1860s, after receiving an inheritance a Philadelphia Quaker school teacher heads west to Wyoming to establish a new school to educate settler children. However, she encounters a corrupt tycoon who is determined to gain control of the water rights of her schoolhouse. She eventually lobbies to gain women the right to vote in local elections, and defeats the villain with the assistance of a lawyer whom she eventually marries.

Cast

 Loretta Young as Annie Morgan 
 Robert Preston as Steve Lewis 
 Edward Arnold as James 'Jim' Cork 
 Frank Craven as Hank Foreman 
 Gladys George as Elsie  
 Jessie Ralph as Mrs. McGuinness  
 Stanley Fields as Jerry Stover 
 Willie Best as George  
 Samuel S. Hinds as Governor Howard  
 Spencer Charters as Dr. McGuinness 
 Clare Verdera as Mrs. Matthews 
 Al Bridge as Mr. Matthews  
 Charles Williams as Clerk  
 Erville Alderson as Ike Fairchild  
 Emmett Vogan as Stanton  
 Roger Imhof as Uncle Bill  
 William B. Davidson as Nye Dunbar  
 James Kirkwood as Politician  
 Wade Boteler as Turk
 Harry Cording as Mike
 Richard Alexander as Henchman (uncredited)
 Ethan Laidlaw as Waiter (uncredited)

Production
The film was shot at Universal Studios, and on location in the Mojave Desert. It was made for $535,000, somewhat under its scheduled budget of $622,000.

References

Bibliography
 Dick, Bernard F. Hollywood Madonna: Loretta Young. University Press of Mississippi, 2011.

External links

1941 films
1940s Western (genre) comedy films
1940s historical comedy films
American historical comedy films
1940s English-language films
Films about Quakers
Films directed by Frank Lloyd
Films set in the 1860s
Films set in Wyoming
Universal Pictures films
Films scored by Frank Skinner
American black-and-white films
Films with screenplays by Kathryn Scola
1941 comedy films
1940s American films